Sahlon is a village in the Nawanshahr district of Punjab. Village provide all the facilities regarding education, health, water to the villagers. Four Sikh shrine, 3-4 temples make this place more beautiful. Two schools in the village shows the rise in the future of kids. Survey done by Harwinder Kaur daughter of Mr. Makhan Ram shows that villagers are most likely to live in foreign countries that are Canada, England. Today, there are not many youth remaining in the village which was once versatile with all age groups as most have immigrated abroad- most recently Canada. Majority of the villagers from this pind belong to the Rajput caste and carry the last name Bhatti.

References

Nawanshahr
Villages in Shaheed Bhagat Singh Nagar district